The 2018–19 Columbus Blue Jackets season was the 19th season for the National Hockey League franchise that was established on June 25, 1997. On April 5, 2019, the Blue Jackets clinched a playoff spot after a 3–2 shootout win over the New York Rangers.

The Blue Jackets won their first ever playoff series by sweeping the Presidents' Trophy winners, the Tampa Bay Lightning, in the First Round of the playoffs. However, the Blue Jackets were not able to carry their success into the Second Round, and they were eliminated by the Boston Bruins in six games.

Standings

Schedule and results

Preseason
The preseason schedule was published on June 15, 2018.

Regular season
The regular season schedule was released on June 21, 2018.

Playoffs

The Blue Jackets faced the Tampa Bay Lightning in the First Round of the playoffs, and swept the series in four games, marking the first time in franchise history the team won a playoff series.

The Blue Jackets faced the Boston Bruins in the Second Round of the playoffs, where they fell to the Bruins in six games.

Player statistics
As of May 6, 2019

Skaters

Goaltenders

†Denotes player spent time with another team before joining the Blue Jackets. Stats reflect time with the Blue Jackets only.
‡Denotes player was traded mid-season. Stats reflect time with the Blue Jackets only.
Bold/italics denotes franchise record.

Transactions
The Blue Jackets have been involved in the following transactions during the 2018–19 season.

Trades

Free agents

Waivers

Contract terminations

Retirement

Signings

Draft picks

Below are the Columbus Blue Jackets' selections at the 2018 NHL Entry Draft, which was held on June 22 and 23, 2018, at the American Airlines Center in Dallas, Texas.

Notes:
 The Detroit Red Wings' sixth-round pick went to the Columbus Blue Jackets as the result of a trade on June 23, 2018, that sent a sixth-round pick in 2019 to Detroit in exchange for this pick.

References

Columbus Blue Jackets seasons
Columbus Blue Jackets
Blue
Blue